Gastragonum is a genus of beetles in the family Carabidae, containing the following species:

 Gastragonum caecum Moore, 1977
 Gastragonum frontepunctum Darlington, 1952
 Gastragonum laevisculptum Darlington, 1952
 Gastragonum subrotundum Darlington, 1952
 Gastragonum terrestroides Darlington, 1952
 Gastragonum trechoides Darlington, 1952

References

Platyninae